Great Pianists of the 20th Century – Martha Argerich II is the third volume of the Great Pianists of the 20th Century box set and is the second of two volumes dedicated to her. The album features music by the composers Frédéric Chopin, Franz Liszt, and Robert Schumann. The works were recorded between 1960 and 1975.

Featured works

Frédéric Chopin
Prelude in C sharp minor, Op. 45
Polonaise in A flat, Op. 61 'Polonaise Fantasie'
3 Mazurkas, Op. 59
Scherzo No. 3 in C sharp minor, Op. 39
24 Preludes, Op. 28
Scherzo No. 2 in B flat minor, Op. 31
Polonaise in A flat, Op. 53 'Heroic'
Piano Sonata No. 3 in B minor, Op. 58

Robert Schumann
Piano Sonata No. 2 in G minor, Op. 22

Franz Liszt
Piano Sonata in B minor, S. 178
Hungarian Rhapsody No. 6 in D flat major, S. 244

Track listing

Disc 1
 "Prelude in C sharp minor, Op. 45" – 4:02
 "Polonaise in A flat, Op. 61 'Polonaise-Fantasie'" – 11:28
 "Mazurka in A minor, Op. 59 No. 1" – 3:17
 "Mazurka in A flat, Op. 59 No. 2" – 2:16
 "Mazurka in F sharp minor, Op. 59 No. 3" – 2:42
 "Scherzo No. 3 in C sharp minor" – 6:26
 "Prelude No. 1 in C, Op. 28" – 0:30
 "Prelude No. 2 in A minor, Op. 28" – 2:10
 "Prelude No. 3 in G, Op. 28" – 0:51
 "Prelude No. 4 in E minor, Op. 28" – 1:52
 "Prelude No. 5 in D, Op. 28" – 0:31
 "Prelude No. 6 in B minor, Op. 28" – 1:47
 "Prelude No. 7 in A, Op. 28" – 0:44
 "Prelude No. 8 in F sharp minor, Op. 28 – 1:27
 "Prelude No. 9 in E, Op. 28" – 1:30
 "Prelude No. 10 in C sharp minor, Op. 28" – 0:25
 "Prelude No. 11 in B, Op. 28" – 0:33
 "Prelude No. 12 in G sharp minor, Op. 28" – 0:57
 "Prelude No. 13 in F sharp, Op. 28" – 2:45
 "Prelude No. 14 in E flat minor, Op. 28" – 0:28
 "Prelude No. 15 in D flat, Op. 28 'Raindrop'" – 4:51
 "Prelude No. 16 in B flat minor, Op. 28" – 0:59
 "Prelude No. 17 in A flat, Op. 28" – 2:48
 "Prelude No. 18 in F minor, Op. 28" – 0:47
 "Prelude No. 19 in E flat, Op. 28" – 1:04
 "Prelude No. 20 in C minor, Op. 28" – 1:32
 "Prelude No. 21 in B flat, Op. 28" – 1:34
 "Prelude No. 22 in G minor, Op. 28" – 0:35
 "Prelude No. 23 in F, Op. 28" – 0:43
 "Prelude No. 24 in D minor, Op. 28" – 2:12
 "Scherzo No. 2 in B flat minor, Op. 31" – 8:50
 "Polonaise in A flat, Op. 53 'Heroic' – 6:17

Disc 2
 "Allegro maestoso" – 10:53
 "Scherzo. Molto vivace" – 2:15
 "Largo" – 8:42
 "Finale. Presto non tanto" – 4:21
 "So rasch wie möglich – Schneller – Noch schneller" – 5:28
 "Andantino" – 4:53
 "Scherzo. Sehr rasch und markiert" – 1:31
 "Rondo. Presto – Etwas langsamer – Prestissimo, quasi candeza – Immer schneller und schneller" – 4:41
 "Lento assai – Allegro energico – Grandioso – Recitativo" – 10:45
 "Anndante sostenuto" – 5:35
 "Allegro energico – Andante sostenuto – Lento assai" – 9:25
 "Hungarian Rhaspsody No. 6 in D flat" – 6:17

1999 classical albums
1999 compilation albums